The term Eurasian backflow, or Eurasian back-migrations, has been used to describe several pre-Neolithic and Neolithic migration events of humans from western Eurasia back to Africa. Homo sapiens had left Africa about 70-50,000 years ago, and between 30,000-15,000 years ago migrated back from the Middle East into Northern Africa. About 3,000 years ago, or already early between 9,000 to 6,000 years ago, farmers from Anatolia and the Near East migrated into the Horn of Africa. Signs of this migration can be found in the genomes of contemporary people from all over East Africa. Next to Eastern Africa, significant Eurasian ancestry is found in Northern Africa, and among specific ethnic groups of the Horn of Africa, as well as among the Malagasy people of Madagascar. Various genome studies found also evidence for multiple pre-Neolithic back-migrations from various Eurasian populations and subsequent admixture with native groups. West-Eurasian geneflow arrived to Northern Africa during the Paleolithic (30,000 to 15,000 years ago), followed by other pre-Neolithic and Neolithic migration events. Genetic data on the Taforalt samples "demonstrated that Northern Africa received significant amounts of gene-flow from Eurasia predating the Holocene and development of farming practices". Medieval geneflow events, such as the Arab expansion also left traces in various African populations.

The people migrating back to Africa were closely related to the Neolithic farmers who had brought agriculture from the Near East to Europe about 7,000 years ago. This population is also closely related to present-day Sardinians. A study from 2020 inferred two sources for the spread of Eurasian admixture in Northeastern Africa, with one associated with pastoralism. The initial phase was 6-5 kya, involving groups originating from the Levant and North Africa that gave rise to the Pastoral Neolithic. Further studies have shown that the back-migration into the region was a complex process, identifying multiple origins for the Eurasian component in Northeast African groups today.  

A report in November 2015 on a 4,500 year old Ethiopian genome had originally overestimated the genetic influence of the Eurasian backflow, claiming that signs of the migration could be found in genomes all over Africa. This mistaken claim was based on a data processing error and was corrected in February 2016. The West Asian admixture was only predominant in the populations of the Horn of Africa, in particular Ethiopian highlanders, and less relevant or absent in the genetic makeup of West or Central Africans.

References 

Prehistoric migrations